União de Minas is a municipality in the west of the Brazilian state of Minas Gerais.

Location
União de Minas belongs to the statistical micro-region of Frutal. It is located at an elevation of 521 meters between the São Domingos River and the Grande River.

Neighboring municipalities are:
North: Santa Vitória
West: Limeira do Oeste
East: Campina Verde
South: Iturama

Economy
The most important economic activities are cattle raising, commerce, and agriculture.  The GDP in 2005 was R$ R$59 million of which 36 million came from agriculture.  União de Minas is in the top tier of municipalities in the state with regard to economic and social development.  As of 2007 there were no banking agencies in the town.  There was a small  retail infrastructure serving the surrounding area of cattle and agricultural lands.  There were 305 automobiles in all of the municipality, about one for every 15 inhabitants.

In the rural area there were 483 establishments occupying 86,000 hectares.  About 800 persons were employed in agriculture.  102 of the farms had tractors, a ratio of one in four farms.  There were 124,000 head of cattle in 2006, of which 28,000 head were dairy cows.  In permanent crops there were 53,000 ha. planted, while in perennial crops 1,000 ha. were planted (2006).   The crops with a planted area of more than 1,000 hectares were sugarcane, corn, and soybeans.

Health and education
In the health sector there was 01 health clinic and 01 hospital with 17 beds.  In the educational sector there were 03 primary schools and 01 middle school.

Municipal Human Development Index: 0.716 (2000)
State ranking: 474 out of 853 municipalities as of 2000
National ranking: 1,295 out of 5,138 municipalities as of 2000
Literacy rate: 82%
Life expectancy: 67 (average of males and females)

The highest ranking municipality in Minas Gerais in 2000 was Poços de Caldas with 0.841, while the lowest was Setubinha with 0.568.  Nationally the highest was São Caetano do Sul in São Paulo with 0.919, while the lowest was Setubinha.  In more recent statistics (considering 5,507 municipalities) Manari in the state of Pernambuco has the lowest rating in the country—0,467—putting it in last place.

References

See also
 List of municipalities in Minas Gerais

Municipalities in Minas Gerais
Populated places established in 1997
1997 establishments in Brazil